Kooringal is a coastal town and locality on the south-west coast of Moreton Island within the City of Brisbane, Queensland, Australia. In the  the locality of Kooringal had a population of 45 people.

Geography
Kooringal consists of a few streets of housing along the south-western tip of Moreton Island. It is connected to the other settlements on the island by two routes:
 the Toulkerrie-Kooringal Bypass Road which travels north through the mangroves along the west coast until the sandy western beach commences. At this point the road becomes known as the Tangalooma-Kooringal Road and travels along the western beach until it reaches Tangalooma. 
 the Mirapool Lagoon Bypass Road which crosses the island to the east coast beach, where it becomes the Mirapool - Middle Track Road and follows the eastern beach to the north

A vehicular barge service operates from Amity Point to Kooringal at some times of year. Otherwise, vehicles must use the barge to Tangalooma and drive south to Kooringal.

A small island (informally known as Crab Island) is to the north-west of Kooringal and the channel between them is called Days Gutter.

Campbell Point is the point at the southern end of Kooringal Esplanade.

History
He built a house and stock yard at this headland. In 1903 he began shipping drought-stricken cattle from western Queensland to the island to fatten them up for sale.

In the 2011 census, Kooringal had a population of 297 people.

In the  the locality of Kooringal had a population of 45 people.

Economy
The Toulkerrie Oyster Farm produces fresh Moreton Bay rock oysters; it takes around three years to grow the oysters large enough for the table. The farming process is environmentally sustainable and won the 2010 National Landcare Awards for Sustainable Farm Practices.

Amenities
Moorgumpin Park (also known as The Dal Pope Reserve) is at 45 Kooringal Esplanade. It has public toilets.

Kooringal Fire Station is an operational fire station metro.

Attractions
The waters in the Kooringal area are noted for their fishing. Consequently, many of the buildings in Kooringal are holiday homes and fishing clubhouses.

References

Further reading

External links 

 

Suburbs of the City of Brisbane
Towns in Queensland
Moreton Island
Localities in Queensland